Ayyub Baninosrat ( is an Iranian wrestler born in Tabriz, East Azerbaijan in Iran.

Education 
Baninosrat received his bachelor's degree in physical education at the University of Tabriz and then received a master's degree in physical education management from Urmia University. He received a doctorate in sports management and marketing from Islamic Azad University, but did not continue his education from the second year. He has been a professor in Islamic Azad University of Tabriz. for 18 years in the field of physical education.

Professional sport 
He entered the wrestling field for the first time in 1982, when he was only 14 years old, motivated by his older brother Davood Baninosrat, and after three years, he was able to reach fourth place in the youth national championship.

Baninosrat became a member of the Iranian national wrestling team in 1990 and won third place at the Beijing Asian Games [2] In the same year. Then, he defeated his powerful opponent, Abbas Jadidi, to advance to the 1992 Barcelona Olympics.

From 1990 to 1996, he was a member of the Iranian national wrestling team in the Olympic, World, Asian, and national wrestling competitions.

Baninosrat wrestled at the 1992 Summer Olympics in Barcelona in 90 kg weight, where he lost 1–0 to Puntsagiin Sükhbat from Mongolia in the first round, but he defeated Iraklis Deskoulidis from Greece in the second round. In the third round, he defeated Tóth  from Hungary, but lost to Kenan Şimşek from Turkey, finishing third in his group, and went to Limonta (Cuba) for the fifth title. Baninosrat finished fifth in the Olympics with a 3–1 victory over Limonta.

In the ninth Asian Wrestling Championships(1993) in Ulaanbaatar, Mongolia, he weighed about 100 kg and defeated his opponents in the 130 kg category to win the gold medal.

He won a gold medal in the international competitions of the Takhti Cup in 1371 and 1372 in the weights of 90 and 100 kg. He also won a bronze medal in the 2nd World University Championships(1996) in the 100 kg weight class.

One of the most significant honors of Ayyub Baninosrat is that he could wear the Pahlavani wrestling armband and become the Pahlevan of Iran for two consecutive years, 1993 & 1994 (1371 & 1372).

External links
مدال آوران ايران در مسابقات كشتي آزاد قهرماني آسيا
مسابقه های کشتی آزاد بازی های المپیک ۱۹۹۲ بارسلونا
 

Living people
Sportspeople from Tabriz
Asian Games silver medalists for Iran
Asian Games bronze medalists for Iran
Wrestlers at the 1990 Asian Games
Wrestlers at the 1994 Asian Games
Asian Games medalists in wrestling
Pahlevans of Iran
1968 births
Academic staff of the Islamic Azad University
Wrestlers at the 1992 Summer Olympics
Iranian male sport wrestlers
Olympic wrestlers of Iran
Medalists at the 1990 Asian Games
Medalists at the 1994 Asian Games